Sharifa Rhodes-Pitts is an American writer and historian.

Life
Rhodes-Pitts is from Houston, Texas, graduated from Harvard and was a Fulbright Scholar in the United Kingdom.

Her work has appeared in The New York Times, Harper's, Vogue, and Essence among other publications.

She won a Rona Jaffe Foundation Writers' Award for non-fiction in 2006, and has received awards from the Lannan Foundation, and the New York Foundation for the Arts. 
She won a 2012 Whiting Award.

Harlem Is Nowhere
Her 2011 book, Harlem Is Nowhere, is the first part of a planned trilogy on African Americans and utopia.
The following books in the trilogy will concern Haiti and the Southern United States. Harlem Is Nowhere was named among 100 Notable Books of 2011 by The New York Times Book Review and nominated for a National Book Critics Circle Award. Harlem Is Nowhere developed from Lenox Terminal, a 2004 essay Rhodes-Pitts wrote for Transition magazine. It was shortlisted for the 2012 Dolman Best Travel Book Award.

Bibliography
2011 – Harlem Is Nowhere (Little, Brown & Co/Granta Books)

References

External links
 Official website
 Profile at The Whiting Foundation
 Parul Sehgal, "Harlem Revisited: PW Talks with Sharifa Rhodes-Pitts", Publishers Weekly, December 6, 2010

Harvard University alumni
21st-century American historians
Living people
People from Houston
Year of birth missing (living people)
American women historians
Rona Jaffe Foundation Writers' Award winners
21st-century American women writers
Historians from Texas